Sugar alcohols (also called polyhydric alcohols, polyalcohols, alditols or glycitols) are organic compounds, typically derived from sugars, containing one  hydroxyl group (–OH) attached to each carbon atom. They are white, water-soluble solids that can occur naturally or be produced industrially by hydrogenating sugars. Since they contain multiple –OH groups, they are classified as polyols.

Sugar alcohols are used widely in the food industry as thickeners and sweeteners. In commercial foodstuffs, sugar alcohols are commonly used in place of table sugar (sucrose), often in combination with high-intensity artificial sweeteners, in order to offset their low sweetness. Xylitol and sorbitol are popular sugar alcohols in commercial foods.

Chemical structure
Sugar alcohols have the general formula HOCH2(CHOH)nCH2OH. In contrast, sugars have two fewer hydrogen atoms, for example HOCH2(CHOH)nCHO or HOCH2(CHOH)n−1C(O)CH2OH. The sugar alcohols differ in chain length. Most have five- or six-carbon chains, because they are derived from pentoses (five-carbon sugars) and hexoses (six-carbon sugars), respectively. They have one –OH group attached to each carbon. They are further differentiated by the relative orientation (stereochemistry) of these –OH groups. Unlike sugars, which tend to exist as rings, sugar alcohols do not—although they can be dehydrated to give cyclic ethers (e.g. sorbitol can be dehydrated to isosorbide).

Production

Sorbitol and mannitol
Mannitol is no longer obtained from natural sources; currently, sorbitol and mannitol are obtained by hydrogenation of sugars, using Raney nickel catalysts.  The conversion of glucose and mannose to sorbitol and mannitol is given as:
HOCH2CH(OH)CH(OH)CH(OH)CH(OH)CHO +  H2 → HOCH2CH(OH)CH(OH)CH(OH)CH(OH)CHHOH
More than a million tons of sorbitol are produced in this way every year. Xylitol and lactitol are obtained similarly.

Erythritol
Erythritol is obtained by the fermentation of glucose and sucrose.

Health effects
Sugar alcohols do not contribute to tooth decay; in fact, xylitol deters tooth decay.

Sugar alcohols are absorbed at 50% of the rate of sugars, resulting in less of an effect on blood sugar levels as measured by comparing their effect to sucrose using the glycemic index. The unabsorbed sugar alcohols may cause bloating and diarrhea  if consumed in sufficient amounts.

Common sugar alcohols

Ethylene glycol (2-carbon)
Glycerol (3-carbon)
Erythritol (4-carbon)
Threitol (4-carbon)
Arabitol (5-carbon)
Xylitol (5-carbon)
Ribitol (5-carbon)
Mannitol (6-carbon)
Sorbitol (6-carbon)
Galactitol (6-carbon)
Fucitol (6-carbon)
Iditol (6-carbon)
Inositol (6-carbon; a cyclic sugar alcohol)
Volemitol (7-carbon)
Isomalt (12-carbon)
Maltitol (12-carbon)
Lactitol (12-carbon)
Maltotriitol (18-carbon)
Maltotetraitol (24-carbon)
Polyglycitol

Both disaccharides and monosaccharides can form sugar alcohols; however, sugar alcohols derived from disaccharides (e.g. maltitol and lactitol) are not entirely hydrogenated because only one aldehyde group is available for reduction.

Sugar alcohols as food additives
This table presents the relative sweetness and food energy of the most widely used sugar alcohols. Despite the variance in food energy content of sugar alcohols, the  European Union's labeling requirements assign a blanket value of 2.4 kcal/g to all sugar alcohols.

Characteristics
As a group, sugar alcohols are not as sweet as sucrose, and they have slightly less food energy than sucrose. Their flavor is similar to sucrose, and they can be used to mask the unpleasant aftertastes of some high-intensity sweeteners.

Sugar alcohols are not metabolized by oral bacteria, and so they do not contribute to tooth decay. They do not brown or caramelize when heated.

In addition to their sweetness, some sugar alcohols can produce a noticeable cooling sensation in the mouth when highly concentrated, for instance in sugar-free hard candy or chewing gum. This happens, for example, with the crystalline phase of sorbitol, erythritol, xylitol, mannitol, lactitol and maltitol. The cooling sensation is due to the dissolution of the sugar alcohol being an endothermic (heat-absorbing) reaction, one with a strong heat of solution.

Absorption from the small intestine
Sugar alcohols are usually incompletely absorbed into the blood stream from the small intestine which generally results in a smaller change in blood glucose than "regular" sugar (sucrose). This property makes them popular sweeteners among diabetics and people on low-carbohydrate diets. As an exception, erythritol is actually absorbed in the small intestine and excreted unchanged through urine, so it contributes no calories even though it is rather sweet.

Side effects
Like many other incompletely digestible substances, overconsumption of sugar alcohols can lead to bloating, diarrhea and flatulence because they are not fully absorbed in the small intestine. Some individuals experience such symptoms even in a single-serving quantity. With continued use, most people develop a degree of tolerance to sugar alcohols and no longer experience these symptoms.

References

 
Sugar substitutes

fr:Polyol